D. Stewart Company Store was the first building in Ione, California, United States. It was a general store. It opened in 1856. It's listed as a California Historical Landmark.

History

Daniel Stewart founded the company in 1856 in Ione. He built it with his brother out of bricks made in Muletown, California. It was one of 50 buildings in Ione. The company was active in service organizations. They sponsored the building of a new school. The family lived in Ione and ran the store for many years.

References

California Historical Landmarks
History of Amador County, California
1856 establishments in California